Brachytarsophrys carinense (common names: Burmese horned toad, Karin Hills frog, and many others) is a species of frog in the family Megophryidae. It is now understood to include Brachytarsophrys platyparietus of China. Defined this way, its distribution area includes southern Myanmar and the adjacent Thailand and southern China.

In Thailand, it is found in Doi Suthep–Pui National Park, Chiang Mai Province and in Khao Nan National Park, Nakhon Si Thammarat Province.

Taxonomy
Brachytarsophrys platyparietus Rao & Yang, 1997 is now considered a synonym of Brachytarsophrys carinense. This taxon represented the Chinese component of the present B. carinense. In 2004 the International Union for Conservation of Nature assessed Brachytarsophrys platyparietus to be of "Least concern".

Description

Habitat and conservation
Brachytarsophrys carinense are associated with forest streams where their larvae develop. In China it is common where it occurs, whereas in Myanmar and Thailand it is considered to be uncommon to rare.

The species is widespread and there are no major threats, but it is potentially threatened by habitat loss. In China it is collected for local consumption, but at present this is not a major threat.

Behavior
When disturbed, it produces a distress call that is a loud scream lasting 6 to 10 seconds long.

References

External links 
 Flickr photo by Michael Cota, Khao Nan National Park - Thailand

carinense
Amphibians of Myanmar
Amphibians of China
Amphibians of Thailand
Amphibians described in 1889
Taxa named by George Albert Boulenger
Taxonomy articles created by Polbot